Buhay (Filipino, "Life") is the ninth studio album of the Filipino rock band, Rivermaya. It contains 16 tracks and was released under Warner Music Philippines on January 21, 2008. This album is the first of Rivermaya without Rico Blanco as the band's vocalist. He is replaced by then 18-year-old Jayson Fernandez, who won the search for a new vocalist in a series of reality TV auditions. The band members took turns on vocals with the arrangement that whoever wrote the song, will be the one to sing it. The band has released four singles from this album, "Sugal ng Kapalaran", "Maskara", "Sleep" and "Ligawan Stage (Nerbyoso Part 2)".

Track listing

Personnel 
 Japs Sergio – lead vocals (tracks 2, 5, 9, 11, 15), bass, guitar (tracks 15, 16), backing vocals
 Jayson Fernandez – lead vocals (tracks 3, 4, 9, 13, 16), guitar, backing vocals
 Mike Elgar – lead vocals (tracks 6, 12, 14), guitar, keyboards, backing vocals
 Mark Escueta – lead vocals (tracks 1, 7, 8, 10), drums, percussion, trumpet, guitars, synths (tracks 8, 10), backing vocals

Additional musicians:
Aia de Leon – additional vocals (track 3)
Hans Dimayuga – backing vocals (track 12)
Mike Vicente – Piano & Organ (track 12), Synth & Organ (Track 14)
Jerome Velasco – lead guitar (track 9)

Album credits 
Executive Producer: Jim Baluyut
Associate Producers: Lizza Nakpil & Chito S. Roño
Producer: Rivermaya
Art Direction: Sarah Gaugler
Sound Engineers: Mark Escueta, Japs Sergio, Mike Elgar and Jayson Fernandez
Mastered by Angee Rozul at Tracks Studios
All Songs arranged by Rivermaya
All Tracks are recorded at the Birdhouse, El Garden & Japs Loft Studios; Mixed at the Birdhouse

References
 

2006 albums
Rivermaya albums